Johannes Ott (1919–1995) was a German art director known for his work in the country's film industry. In the early stages of his career he collaborated frequently with the veteran set designer Erich Kettelhut.

Selected filmography
 Prisoners of Love (1954)
 A Love Story (1954)
 Three Days Confined to Barracks (1955)
 Children, Mother, and the General (1955)
 Three Girls from the Rhine (1955)
 One Woman Is Not Enough? (1955)
 Das Mädchen Marion (1956)
 Night Nurse Ingeborg (1958)
 The Muzzle (1958)
 The Man Who Sold Himself (1959)
 The Thousand Eyes of Dr. Mabuse (1960)
 Until Money Departs You (1960)
 Storm in a Water Glass (1960)
 Girl from Hong Kong (1961)
 The Post Has Gone (1962)
 Life Begins at Eight (1962)
 Freddy and the Song of the South Pacific (1963)
 The Lightship (1963)
 The Pirates of the Mississippi (1963)
 If You Go Swimming in Tenerife (1964)
 The Body in the Thames (1971)

References

Bibliography
 David Kalat. The Strange Case of Dr. Mabuse: A Study of the Twelve Films and Five Novels. McFarland, 2015.

External links

1919 births
1995 deaths
German art directors
Film people from Berlin